Revue is an album by the jazz group the World Saxophone Quartet released on the Italian Black Saint label. The album features performances and compositions by Hamiet Bluiett, Julius Hemphill, Oliver Lake and David Murray.

Reception

The AllMusic review by Scott Yanow awarded the album 4 stars, stating, "The nine numbers on this set are generally concise (only two songs exceed six minutes) and consist of originals by all four saxophonists... Sometimes quite rhythmic (and almost danceable) despite not having a rhythm section, the WSQ used melodies and rhythm for their own purposes, creating unpredictable music that always holds one's attention. This release is a good example of their talents."

The authors of the Penguin Guide to Jazz Recordings wrote that, in relation to the group's previous albums, "with Revue... the centre of gravity shifts slightly towards rising star Murray and towards what looks like a reassessment of the group's development."

Writing for Jazz Times, Michael J. West stated that the album "contains music that was unquestionably avant-garde but also remarkably accessible. Hemphill's title track and Bluiett's 'I Heard That' offer sly (rhythm and) blues grooves; 'Slide' swings as hard as anything can without a rhythm section; and even meditations like Murray's 'Ming' and Lake's 'Hymn for the Old Year' have surprising hooks in them. If loft jazz remains something of an obscurity, its aftermath is indelible."

Track listing
 "Revue" (Hemphill) - 8:00  
 "Affairs of the Heart" (Hemphill) - 5:40  
 "Slide" (Hemphill) - 3:41  
 "Little Samba" (Hemphill) - 5:26  
 "I Heard That" (Bluiett) - 3:23  
 "Hymn for the Old Year" (Lake) - 4:24  
 "Ming" (Murray) - 4:21  
 "David's Tune" (Murray) - 8:15  
 "Quinn Chapel A.M. E Church" (Bluiett) - 1:03

Personnel
Hamiet Bluiett — baritone saxophone
Julius Hemphill — alto saxophone
Oliver Lake — alto saxophone
David Murray — tenor saxophone

References

1982 albums
Black Saint/Soul Note albums
World Saxophone Quartet albums